Blake Ahearn (born May 27, 1984) is an American professional basketball coach and former player who is an assistant coach for the Memphis Grizzlies of the National Basketball Association (NBA). He played college basketball for Missouri State.

High school career
Ahearn attended Immacolata School in St. Louis for grade school. He then went to  De Smet Jesuit High School in St. Louis, Missouri. He played three years of varsity. He averaged 17.7  points per game as a junior and 18.5 as a senior. He was an All-Metro Selection his junior and senior years and an All-State selection his junior year.  In his junior year, he broke his hand in the divisional semifinal game.  He was unable to play for the duration of his junior year.  His team was state runner-up his junior year losing to Missouri powerhouse Vashon High School in the state championship game.

College career
Ahearn played collegiately for the Missouri State Bears from 2003–2007. He was poised to finish his career with four straight NCAA free-throw titles but failed, and finished with an accuracy of 92.5% during his senior year. He finished his college career as a 94.6% free throw shooter, 435 for 460, all-time best percentage. He also holds a single-season record at 97.5%. He made 60 consecutive free-throws twice in his career (December 20, 2003, through February 14, 2004, and December 19, 2004, to February 26, 2005) which are school and Missouri Valley Conference records. He missed his final attempt against the San Diego State Aztecs in the NIT on March 24, 2007, his final college game. He holds the record for career three-pointers at Missouri State with 276 and was selected the Missouri Valley Conference (MVC) Freshman of the Year (2004), also being a two-time all-MVC first teamer (2006 and 2007). He came within one game each season of making the NCAA tournament and failed to reach any. His team lost in double overtime to Northern Iowa in the MVC Tournament finals his freshman year and to Creighton in the MVC finals his sophomore year. His team was rated 21st in the RPI his junior year and 33rd his senior year, which included a win over #7 in the nation Wisconsin.

Professional career

2007–08 season

NBA D-League
In the 2007–2008 season, Ahearn played with the NBA Development League's Dakota Wizards. He worked his way to the starting lineup, averaging 19 points, with a 96% free-throw percentage, shooting 49% from the field and 44% from 3-point range in 41 games.

NBA
On March 21, 2008, Ahearn was signed to a 10-day contract by the NBA's Miami Heat, whose roster had been depleted by injuries. On March 27, Ahearn scored a team-high 15 points in a loss to the Detroit Pistons.

On April 10, Ahearn was named the Rookie of the Year of the D-League and All-NBA Development League Second Team.

2008–09 season
Despite posting a solid NBA preseason during which he averaged 8 points per game, Ahearn was cut by the Minnesota Timberwolves on October 23, 2008. After being waived by the Timberwolves he joined the Dakota Wizards. On November 16, Ahearn was signed by the San Antonio Spurs becoming the 2008–09 season's first D-League call-up. Ahearn was in camp with the Wizards prior to signing with the Spurs. On November 30, Ahearn was assigned to the Spurs' D-League affiliate Austin Toros.

The Spurs waived Ahearn on December 15, 2008, and he re-joined the Dakota Wizards. He was selected to play in the D-League All-Star Game on February 14, 2009, where he was awarded MVP alongside Courtney Sims.

2009–10 season
The following season Ahearn signed a contract with Estudiantes Madrid in Spain, until he moved back and played for Bakersfield Jam and for Erie BayHawks in the NBA Development League.

2010–11 season
On August 1,  Ahearn signed a contract with the Italian team Teramo Basket but he was waived after a few games.

On December 29, he re-signed with the Erie BayHawks.

2011–12 season
Blake started the 2011–12 season participating for the United States Basketball Team in the 2011 Pan American Games. The United States won the Bronze medal with a win over the Dominican Republic in the Medal Rounds. Blake was second on the team in scoring, averaging 10 points per game, including a team-high 21 points vs Brazil in round robin play.

After the games, Blake signed with the Erie Bayhawks in the NBA Development League. On draft day Blake was traded to the Reno Bighorns.

Blake attended training camp with the Los Angeles Clippers during the first part of the D-League season. He then returned to the Bighorns.

During the 2011–12 season Blake led the NBA-D League in scoring at 23.8 points per game He was selected to play in the D-League All-Star Game and had 21 points and 8 assists during the game. Blake also set the NBA and NBA D-League mark of 110 consecutive free throws during his season in Reno. Blake set the all-time career points record for the NBA Development league in 2012.

On April 10, the Utah Jazz signed Blake Ahearn to a 10-day contract. On April 20, he was signed for the remainder of the season.

2012–13 season
In September 2012, Ahearn signed with the Indiana Pacers of the NBA. On October 22, 2012, Ahearn was waived by the Indiana Pacers.

In December 2012, he signed with the Dongguan Leopards of the CBA.

2013–14 season
On August 12, 2013, Ahearn signed with Budivelnyk Kyiv.

2014–15 season
On December 18, 2014, Ahearn signed with Capitanes de Arecibo for the 2015 BSN season. However, he left the club in February 2015 after appearing in just three games.

On March 11, 2015, he was acquired by the Santa Cruz Warriors. On April 26, he won the D-League championship with the Warriors.

Coaching career
In 2015, Ahearn became head boys' coach at Clayton High School in Clayton, Missouri. Following a 7–17 season there he was hired to coach his alma mater, De Smet Jesuit.

On August 1, 2017, Ahearn was named the head coach of the Austin Spurs of the NBA G League.

On June 20, 2020, the Memphis Grizzlies announced that they had hired Ahearn as assistant coach.

Career statistics

NBA

Regular season

|-
| style="text-align:left;"| 
| style="text-align:left;"| Miami
| 12 || 0 || 14.8 || .263 || .294 || .968 || 1.6 || 1.6 || .5 || .0 || 5.8
|-
| style="text-align:left;"| 
| style="text-align:left;"| San Antonio
| 3 || 0 || 6.3 || .333 || .500|| 1.000 || .3 || .7 || .3 || .0 || 2.7
|-
| style="text-align:left;"| 
| style="text-align:left;"| Utah
| 4 || 0 || 7.5 || .286 || .222 || .000 || .5 || .3 || .0 || .0 || 2.5
|- class="sortbottom"
| style="text-align:center;" colspan="2"| Career
| 19 || 0 || 11.9 || .273 || .298 || .970 || 1.2 || 1.2 || .4 || .0 || 4.6

Playoffs

|-
| style="text-align:left;"| 2012
| style="text-align:left;"| Utah
| 3 || 0 || 2.7 || .667 || 1.000 || .000 || .0 || .7 || .0 || .0 || 1.7
|- class="sortbottom"
| style="text-align:center;" colspan="2"| Career
| 3 || 0 || 2.7 || .667 || 1.000 || .000 || .0 || .7 || .0 || .0 || 1.7

NBA D-League

Regular season 

|-
| style="text-align:left;"| 2007–08
| style="text-align:left;"| Dakota
| 41 || 15 || 29.4 || .486 || .439 || style="background:#cfecec;"| .960* || 2.0 || 3.5 || .7 || .0 || 19.0
|-
| style="text-align:left;"| 2008–09
| style="text-align:left;"| Austin
| 6 || 6 || 34.3 || .444 || .531 || style="background:#cfecec;"| .914* || 2.3 || 6.0 || .8 || .0 || 18.8
|-
| style="text-align:left;"| 2008–09
| style="text-align:left;"| Dakota
| 41 || 41 || 38.7 || .445 || .420 || style="background:#cfecec;"| .957* || 2.4 || 5.0 || .7 || .0 || 22.7
|-
| style="text-align:left;"| 2009–10
| style="text-align:left;"| Bakersfield
| 17 || 10 || 32.8 || .367 || .277 || style="background:#cfecec;"| .932* || 2.1 || 4.1 || 1.2 || .1 || 14.3
|-
| style="text-align:left;"| 2009–10
| style="text-align:left;"| Erie
| 13 || 13 || 45.1 || .433 || .440 || style="background:#cfecec;"| .961* || 4.5 || 6.7 || 1.2 || .3 || 25.7
|-
| style="text-align:left;"| 2010–11
| style="text-align:left;"| Erie
| 31 || 25 || 33.7 || .406 || .354 || style="background:#cfecec;"| .962* || 2.7 || 5.8 || 1.1 || .2 || 16.9
|-
| style="text-align:left;"| 2011–12
| style="text-align:left;"| Reno
| 37 || 37 || 37.5 || .469 || .409 || style="background:#cfecec;"| .962* || 3.5 || 5.1 || 1.1 || .1 || 23.8
|-
| style="text-align:left;background:#afe6ba;"| 2014–15†
| style="text-align:left;"| Santa Cruz
| 9 || 0 || 21.2 || .397 || .375 || .944 || 1.9 || 2.7 || .7 || .0 || 9.6
|- class="sortbottom"
|style="text-align:center;" colspan="2"|Career
| 195 || 147 || 34.7 || .444 || .404 || style="background:#e0cef2;"|.956  || 2.5 || 4.8 || .9 || .1 || 19.9

Domestic leagues statistics

International statistics

References

External links
Eurobasket.com profile
NBA D-League profile

1984 births
Living people
American expatriate basketball people in China
American expatriate basketball people in Italy
American expatriate basketball people in Spain
American expatriate basketball people in Ukraine
American men's basketball players
Austin Spurs coaches
Austin Toros players
Bakersfield Jam players
Basketball coaches from Missouri
Basketball players at the 2011 Pan American Games
Basketball players from St. Louis
BC Budivelnyk players
Capitanes de Arecibo players
CB Estudiantes players
Dakota Wizards players
Erie BayHawks (2008–2017) players
High school basketball coaches in Missouri
Liga ACB players
Miami Heat players
Missouri State Bears basketball players
Pan American Games bronze medalists for the United States
Pan American Games medalists in basketball
Point guards
Reno Bighorns players
San Antonio Spurs players
Santa Cruz Warriors players
Shenzhen Leopards players
Teramo Basket players
Undrafted National Basketball Association players
Utah Jazz players
Medalists at the 2011 Pan American Games